Sergei Vladimirovich Yuferov (also Sergei Iuferov, Serge Youferoff, Sergej Wladimirowich Juferow; born 1865 in Odessa) was a Russian (Ukrainian) composer and pianist.

Yuferov studied with Alexander Glazunov and Nikolai Klenovsky (Николай Семёнович Кленовский) (1857–1915) in Saint Petersburg, and with Nikolai Hubert (Николай Альбертович Губерт) (1840–1888) and Herman Laroche in Moscow.

Yuferov was active in Switzerland in 1906.

Selected works
Opera
 Myrrha (Мирра), Opera in 4 acts, Op. 21 (1891); libretto by the composer
 Yolande (Иоланда), Opera in 2 acts, Op. 22 (1893); libretto by Prince Dm. Goletsin
 Antoine et Cléopatre (Антоний и Клеопатра), Opera in 4 acts with prologue, Op. 24 (1899–1900); libretto by the composer after the play by William Shakespeare

Orchestral
 Marche funèbre, Op. 7 No. 4; original version for piano solo
 Moussia s'amuse, Suite de scènes d'enfant, Op. 18; also for piano solo
 Scènes et danses, Op. 27
 Rêverie orientale, Fantaisie, Op. 28 No. 1 (published 1901)
 Barcarolle "Sur l'eau", Op. 28 No. 2
 Symphoniette in C major, Op. 29 (published 1901)
 Fantaisie algérienne (Алжирская фантазия), Op. 40; also for piano solo
 Fantaisie funèbre „à la mémoire d'un héros de 1905“, Op. 42
 Élégie, Adagio symphonique, Op. 48
 Suite de ballet (Балетная сюита), Op. 49

Concertante
 Fantaisie de concert in B minor for violin and orchestra, Op. 34
 2 Pièces, Op. 43 (1910)
     Chant du Cygne in E minor for cello and orchestra
     Mélancolie in D minor for viola and orchestra

Chamber music
 3 Romances (Три романса) for violin and piano, Op. 36
     Ballade
     Berceuse
     Romance
 Suite for 2 violins, viola, cello, harmonium and piano, Op. 44
     Introduction
     Petite valse
     Aveu
     Paraphrase
     Arabesque
     Nocturne
     Sérénade
 Piano Trio in C minor, Op. 52 (published 1913)

Piano
 6 Arabesques (Арабески), Op. 1 (published c.1885)
     Improvisation
     Romance
     Élégie in F major
     Intermezzo
     Rêverie
     Fileuse
 Théâtre des marionettes (Театр марионеток), Suite fantastique, Op. 2
     Introduction
     Arlequin
     Rêve
     Pezzo umoristico
     Espièglerie
     Valse clochante
     Polichinelle
     La ronde de nuit
     Amour de guignol
     Marche des marionettes
 3 Nouvellettes (Новелетты), Op. 3
   in C major
   in E major
   in D major
 Les soupirs, Nouvelle, Op. 7
   Une nuit à Sorrento (Nocturne)
   Intermezzo
   Une nuit à Venise (Nocturne)
   Marche funèbre; also orchestrated
 3 Nouvelles Nouvellettes, Op. 9
   in E major
   in D major
   in G minor
 Entre petits et grands amis, 6 Album Leaves (Листки из альбома), Op. 10
   Boite à musique
   Aveu
   Mazurca
   Petite valse
   Question et réponse
   Mélodie
 En famille, 6 Album Leaves (Листки из альбома), Op. 12
   Feuille d'album
   Petite étude
   Impatience
   Charmeuse
   Un conte
   Caprice
 Mazurca-fantaisie, Op. 14
 Moussia s'amuse, Suite de scènes d'enfant, Op. 18; also orchestrated
 2 Impromptus, Op. 20
   Rêverie
   Valse
 Adoration des pasteurs, Op. 26
 Fantaisie-ballade in D minor, Op. 37
 6 Arabesques nouvelles, Op. 39 (published 1909)
     Chant triste
     Rêverie douloureuse
     Flânerie
     Bagatelle
     Après l'orage
     Intimité
 Fantaisie algérienne (Алжирская фантазия), Op. 40; also orchestrated
 Sonate-fantaisie in C minor, Op. 46 (published 1910)
 6 Pièces pour bébé, Op. 50
     Rondo in G major
     Marche in C major
     Dumka in A minor
     Canzonetta in C major
     Scherzo in G major
     Nocturne in D minor

Vocal
 6 Romances (Шесть романсов) for voice and piano, Op. 3
     На ложѣ дѣвичьемъ
     Жду я тревогой объятъ
     То было раннею весной; also for voice, violin and piano
     Шепотъ робкое дыханье
     Съ ружьемъ за плечами; also for voice and orchestra
     Каждый день въ саду гарема
 5 Romances et un duo (Пять романсов и дуэтъ) for voice and piano, Op. 4
     Спишь ты
     Опять я слышу эти свуки
     Тихо все
     Чолнъ плыветъ; words by Apollon Maykov; also for voice and orchestra
     Баркаролла; also for voice and orchestra
     Лилія (дуэтъ)
 3 Romances sur paroles de Fr. Coppée for voice and piano, Op. 6; words by François Coppée
     Вы какъ хотите и какъ знайте (Vous aurez beau faire)
     Какъ только взгляну я на розу (Quand vous me montrez une rose)
     Сѣвера я видѣлъ чудо дитя (Quand de la divine enfant)
 3 Romances sur paroles de Fr. Coppée for voice and piano, Op. 8; words by François Coppée
     Часовню знаю я (Je sais une chapelle)
     Спросилъ я эхо (J'ai cherché dans la solitude)
     Уже давно (Dans le faubourg)
 3 Romances (Три Романсы) for voice and piano or orchestra, Op. 11
     Бѣжитъ за волною
     Плѣнившись розой соловей
     Темнота и туманъ
 5 Romances et un duo (Пять романсов и дуэтъ) for voice and piano, Op. 13
     Еврейская мелодія; also for voice and orchestra
     Не весна тогда; also for voice and orchestra
     Спи дитя, усни; also for voice and orchestra
     Погубили меня твои чорны глаза
     Ты страдаешь опять
     Тучи набѣжали (дуэтъ)
 5 Romances et un duo (Пять романсов и дуэтъ) for voice and piano, Op. 15
     Ты не спрашивай
     Голубенькій, чистый; also for voice and orchestra
     Запахъ розы и жасмина
     Изъ моей великой скорби
     Птички ласточки летите
     Намъ звѣзды кропкія сіяли (дуэтъ)
 3 Romances (Три Романсы) for voice and piano, Op. 16
     Гаснетъ день; also for voice and orchestra
     Листья осенніе
     Милый другъ мой не вѣрь; also for voice and orchestra
 3 Romances (Три Романсы) for voice and piano, Op. 17
     Задремали волны; also for voice and orchestra
     Распустилась черемуха
     На балконѣ цвѣтущей весною
 3 Romances (Три Романсы) for voice and piano or orchestra, Op. 19
     О, если правда что въ ночи
     Я здѣсь Инезилья
     И лугъ и нива
 5 Romances (Пять романсов) for voice and piano or orchestra, Op. 25
     Весною
     Былъ старый король
     Лунная ночь
     Элегія
     Бѣлая равнина
 6 Romances (Шесть романсов) for voice and piano or orchestra, Op. 30
     Когда безъ страсти
     Приди ко мнѣ
     Шепотъ, робкое дыханье
     Я долго стоялъ неподвижно
     Узникъ
     Коль любить такъ безъ разсудка
 5 Romances et un duo (Пять романсов и дуэтъ) for voice and piano, Op. 32; Nos. 1–5 also for voice and orchestra
     Ты помнишь ли Марія
     Дитя, мои пѣсни
     Слѣпой нищій
     Будутъ мнѣ грезиться
     Серенада
     Привѣтъ веснѣ (дуэтъ)
 6 Romances (Шесть романсов) for voice and piano, Op. 33; Nos. 1–5 also for voice and orchestra
     Въ туманѣ смутлыхъ дней
     Въ сумракъ безмолвной лагуны
     Грезы
     Уснула жизнь вокругъ
     Мнѣ жаль всего
     Новаго хоть что нибудь (баллада-шутка)
 3 Romances (Три Романсы) for voice and piano or orchestra, Op. 47
     Розы
     Не говорите мнѣ
     Прощаюсь съ грустными, но милыми мнѣ снами
 6 Poésies de Lermontoff for voice and piano or orchestra, Op. 51; words by Mikhail Lermontov
     Въ морѣ царевичъ купаетъ коня (Un prince baigne en la mer son coursier; Ritt seinen Renner ein Prinz in das Meer)
     Не плачь, не  плачь мое дитя (Ne pleure pas ma chère enfant; Nicht weinen, o nicht weinen, Kind)
     Въ полдневный жаръ (Sous le soleil au Dagestan sauvage; Im öden Dagestan, zur Mittagsstunde)
     Нѣтъ! не тебя я такъ пылко люблю (Non, ce n'est point ta beautéque j'amais; Nein, du bist's nicht, die ich lieb)
     Ты помнишь ли (Te souvient-il du jour si triste; Gedenk des trauervollen Tages)
     Выхожу одинъ я на дорогу (Je chemine seul par la nuit sombre; Einsam wandre ich in Abendschweigen)
 7 Poésies dramatiques for voice and piano or orchestra, Op. 54
     Fleurs de vallon (Eine einsame Blume)
     Nocturne (Nachtstück)
     Sans toi (Was wäre)
     Il passa (Er ging vorbei)
     L'infidèle (Der Ungetreue)
     Rondel de l'adieu (Scheiden)
     Au rouet (Am Spinnrad)
 Essais de musique réligieuse for voice and harmonium, Op. 56

Choral
 Отче нашъ for chorus a cappella, Op. 23
 Ilya Muromets (Илья Муромец, Былина-кантата), Bylina Cantata for soloists, chorus and orchestra, Op. 31
 Очистимъ ягаду for chorus a cappella, Op. 38 No. 1
 Гребцы for chorus a cappella, Op. 38 No. 2

Sources
 Энциклопедии & Словари 
 Биография: Юферов Сергей Владимирович

References

External links

1865 births
Russian classical pianists
Male classical pianists
Russian composers
Russian male composers
Ukrainian classical pianists
Ukrainian classical composers
Date of birth missing
Year of death missing